The Patoka Formation is a geologic formation in Illinois. It preserves fossils dating back to the Carboniferous period.

See also
 List of fossiliferous stratigraphic units in Illinois

References

 

Geologic formations of Illinois
Carboniferous Illinois
Carboniferous southern paleotropical deposits